Saint Demetrios Preparatory School is a private Greek Orthodox Christian school located in Astoria, Queens, New York City.  It is the largest Greek-American and Greek Orthodox day school in the United States, as well as the only Greek Orthodox high school in the United States. It enrolls students from preschool to twelfth grade.

The school is associated with the Saint Demetrios Cathedral.

History
The school was founded in 1956. 

The elementary school building was purchased in 1974, after a wave of immigration by Greek Cypriots to Astoria created a need for additional classrooms. A $1 million donation in 2017 allowed the school to modernize the elementary school facilities.

Greek and Greek-American dignitaries have visited the school, including Antonis Samaras in 2013, Alexis Tsipras in 2016, and Archbishop Elpidophoros of America in 2019.

References

External links

Official School Website

Astoria, Queens
Christian schools in New York (state)
Eastern Orthodox schools in the United States
Eastern Orthodoxy in New York (state)
Greek Orthodoxy in the United States
Greek-American culture in New York City
Private elementary schools in Queens, New York
Private high schools in Queens, New York
Private middle schools in Queens, New York